This is a list of lakes, reservoirs, and water bodies in Costa Rica.

See also 
List of volcanoes in Costa Rica, which includes the crater lakes listed.

References 

 
Costa Rica